Francis Jacot (born 30 March 1956) is a Swiss cross-country skier. He competed in the men's 30 kilometre event at the 1980 Winter Olympics.

References

1956 births
Living people
Swiss male cross-country skiers
Olympic cross-country skiers of Switzerland
Cross-country skiers at the 1980 Winter Olympics
Place of birth missing (living people)
20th-century Swiss people